Melissa Wileman (née Verryt) (born 4 August 1972) is an association football player who represented New Zealand at international level.

Fisher made her Football Ferns début in a 0–0 draw with Korea Republic on 10 September 1995, and finished her international career with 10 caps to her credit.

References

1972 births
Living people
New Zealand women's international footballers
New Zealand women's association footballers

Women's association footballers not categorized by position